The Walker is a 1967 Argentine comedy drama film directed by Enrique Carreras and written by Norberto Aroldi. The play itself was written by Norberto Aroldi.

Cast
 Tita Merello ....  Rosa Mangiacaballo
 Jorge Salcedo ....  Julian
 Luis Tasca ....  Carmelo
 Gloria Ferrandiz ....  Dona Felisa
 Marta Cipriano ....  Juanita
 Juan Carlos Altavista ....  Gorosito
 Oscar Villa ....  Pato
 Adolfo García Grau ....  Doctor Perales
 Jorge De La Riestra ....  Nato
 Alberto Olmedo
 Alfonso Pícaro
 Atilio Pozzobon

Release
The film premiered in Argentina on 24 August 1967.

External links
 

1967 films
1960s Spanish-language films
1967 comedy-drama films
Argentine comedy-drama films
1960s Argentine films
Films directed by Enrique Carreras